Southport is an unincorporated community in Bay County, Florida, United States. It is located along the north side of North Bay and west of Deer Point Lake. The main roads through the community are State Road 77, Edwards Rd, County Road 388, State Road 20, and County Road 2321. It is also part of the Panama City–Lynn Haven–Panama City Beach Metropolitan Statistical Area.

Geography

Southport is located north of Panama City at 30.289444 N, -85.640556 W (30° 17′ 22″ N, 85° 38′ 26″ W). Florida State Road 77 is the main route through the community, leading north 38 mi (61 km) to Chipley on Interstate 10 and south 11 mi (18 km) to the center of Panama City.

Schools
Southport Florida has two schools, Southport Elementary School and Deane Bozeman Middle School. They are part of the Bay County School District.

References

Unincorporated communities in Bay County, Florida
Unincorporated communities in Florida
Former census-designated places in Bay County, Florida
Former census-designated places in Florida